Nemosenecio is a genus of East Asian flowering plants in the groundsel tribe within the sunflower family.

 Species
 Nemosenecio concinnus (Franch.) C.Jeffrey & Y.L.Chen - Sichuan, Chongqing 
 Nemosenecio formosanus (Kitam.) B.Nord. - Taiwan
 Nemosenecio incisifolius (Jeffrey) B.Nord. - Yunnan
 Nemosenecio nikoensis (Miq.) B.Nord. - Japan
 Nemosenecio solenoides (Dunn) B.Nord. - Yunnan
 Nemosenecio yunnanensis B.Nord. - Guizhou, Yunnan

References

Senecioneae
Asteraceae genera
Flora of China
Flora of Eastern Asia